Mohsin Razi (b. May 26, 1955 in Karachi) is a career diplomat from Pakistan. He has served as Ambassador to Philippines since October 2009.

Earlier he served as the Consul General of Pakistan in New York, and was the former Director General National Authority & Disarmament Cell in Islamabad, Pakistan from 2004 to 2006. He has previously served in the Pakistani Embassies in Germany, Iraq and The Netherlands. He speaks English, Urdu, Punjabi, German, and Arabic.

Education 
Razi holds a master's degree in Political Science, from the University of Punjab, and has attended the National Institute of Public Administration, Lahore.

Career 
Razi joined the foreign service in 1982, and has served on several desks in Islamabad, such as Director Economic Cooperation Organization (ECO), Nepal, Bangladesh, Burma & Sri Lanka (NBBS). He was also Director General Europe.

Consul General
Mr. Mohsin Razi is currently the Consul General in New York for Pakistan. He is also accredited to Connecticut, Delaware, Kentucky Maine, Massachusetts, Michigan, New Hampshire, New Jersey, North Dakota, Ohio, Rhode Island, South Dakota and Vermont.

References

External links
Institute of International Education Panelist
 Presentation given on Enhancing International Linkages in Higher Education with Pakistan
On Return of Buddha to Pakistan
Press Release OPCW
Lawyers Rally at N.Y. Courthouse to Support Pakistan's Attorneys
On Immigration Treatment of Edhi

Living people
1955 births
Ambassadors of Pakistan to the Philippines
University of the Punjab alumni